Delaware Valley Friends School (DVFS) is a private school for children with learning disabilities. It is located in the Paoli, Pennsylvania, in Greater Philadelphia.

DVFS is one of two Quaker schools in the Philadelphia area equipped to serve children with learning disabilities.

Demographics 
The demographic breakdown of the 150 students enrolled in 2015-16 was:
 Asian - 4.7%
 Black - 14.7%
 Hispanic - 2.7%
 White - 71.3%
 Multiracial - 6.7%

References

External links 
 

Quaker schools in Pennsylvania
Private middle schools in Pennsylvania
Private high schools in Pennsylvania
Schools in Chester County, Pennsylvania
Special education in the United States